Esmeralda Avenue is a road in a number of towns and cities

Chile
 Esmeralda Avenue Valdivia

New Zealand
 Esmeralda Avenue Avondale Auckland

Puerto Rico
 Esmeralda Avenue Guaynabo, San Juan, Puerto Rico

United States
 Esmeralda Avenue Minden, Nevada
 Esmeralda Avenue San Francisco, California
 Esmeralda Avenue Cleveland-North Collinwood, Ohio
 Esmeralda Avenue Mesa, Arizona
 Esmeralda Avenue Las Vegas, Nevada
 Esmeralda Avenue El Monte, California
 Esmeralda Avenue Moss Beach, California
 Esmeralda Avenue Dayton, Ohio